Frank Leslie Talbot (3 August 1910 – 5 December 1983) was an English professional football player and manager who played as an Inside forward.

Career
Born in Hednesford, Staffordshire, Talbot began his career playing non-league football for his hometown side Hednesford Town before signing for Blackburn Rovers in 1930. Several years later he secured a first team place in the side, but was sold to Cardiff City in 1936 as part of a two player deal which saw Albert Pinxton also travel to Ninian Park. At the time of his signing the club had been in decline over the five previous seasons, but Talbot was part of the side that managed to improve the club's fortunes. In 1939 he was sold to Walsall, but the outbreak of World War II meant he only played one season for the club, the 1946–47 season, before retiring. During the war he also guested for Bath City. Following his retirement he remained active in football as a coach, including working in the Netherlands from 1947 to the early 1970s. In 1953 and 1964 he became with respectively Racing Club Heemstede (RCH) and DWS champion of the Netherlands.

Death
Talbot died in December 1983 at a hospital in Alkmaar, Netherlands.

References

1910 births
1983 deaths
People from Hednesford
English footballers
Association football inside forwards
English Football League players
Hednesford Town F.C. players
Blackburn Rovers F.C. players
Cardiff City F.C. players
Walsall F.C. players
English football managers
Racing Club Heemstede managers
Be Quick 1887 managers
AFC DWS managers
Heracles Almelo managers
AZ Alkmaar managers
FC Eindhoven managers
English expatriate football managers
English expatriate sportspeople in the Netherlands
Expatriate football managers in the Netherlands